Zargaz (also Romanized as Zārgaz; also known as Kalāteh Zangaz and Sar Gaz) is a village in Fakhrud Rural District, Qohestan District, Darmian County, South Khorasan Province, Iran. At the 2006 census, its population was 500, in 128 families.

References 

Populated places in Darmian County